Ralphie the Buffalo is the name of the live mascot of the University of Colorado Buffaloes.  Ralphie has been named one of the best live mascots in sports. 

The team of "Ralphie Handlers", who are varsity student-athletes, run Ralphie around Folsom Field, the University of Colorado's football field, in a horse shoe pattern before each half of each home game. It takes five Ralphie Handlers to run her around the field: two up front on each side to steer her around the field, two in the back on each side to help guide her, and one in far back to control her speed, called the "loop" position. Ralphie can reach speeds of 25 miles per hour (40 km/h). Female bison are used because they are smaller and less aggressive, as well as for insurance reasons, although Ralphie has knocked over her handlers on more than one occasion. Because of this, whether or not Ralphie runs is at the sole discretion of her handlers, and her run may be canceled if she is unusually nervous or upset.

The Team
The Ralphie Handlers are varsity student-athletes who run with Ralphie, take her to appearances, and care for her year round. On an average week during football season, Ralphie Handlers will volunteer 20-30 hours to the program in training, practicing, appearances, and caring for the beloved mascot. In the off season they still put forth 20 hours a week toward the program, always caring for Ralphie and staying in top shape to be able to run with Ralphie. The handlers have designated sprint workouts and lifts twice a week before classes to be able to handle Ralphie and stay in shape for all Ralphie-related tasks, carrying panels and hay bales, to name a few.

The Ralphie Live Mascot Program is under the direction of Program Manager and Coach Taylor Stratton and Assistant Program Manager and Coach Colton Behr. Both Stratton and Behr were Ralphie Handlers when they were students at Colorado. They provide the sprint training for Ralphie and her Handlers and coordinate the care for Ralphie. The team consists of approximately 15 student-athletes made up of both males and females. The Handlers earn a varsity letter each year they are on the team. Handlers first started earning varsity letters in 1987. Even though the Handlers do not fall under NCAA jurisdiction, the Athletic Department still holds them to the same standards as all other varsity athletes in the department, including minimum GPA requirements, full course load, and other rules. The first female Handler joined the team in 1992. Females have had a strong presence in the program ever since.

Initially, the students who ran with Ralphie were called "The Men Who Run with Ralphie." In 1970 the term for the students changed to Ralphie Runners, as a direct representation of the feat they did with Ralphie at each game. As the team and the program became more formalized and regulated, the term for the students became Ralphie Handlers in the late 1980s. The responsibilities and duties of the students on the team increased from just running with Ralphie to assisting in her overall care and maintenance, the reasoning behind changing their name from Ralphie Runners to Ralphie Handlers.

Ralphie's Care
Colorado Athletics and the Ralphie Live Mascot Program are proud of the care and treatment they provide to the buffalo who serves as Colorado's live mascot. Ralphie receives year-round, daily care from a family of "Ralphie" professionals who understand her needs. While the Ralphie Program demonstrates a positive relationship between humans and buffalo, this relationship has been established through knowledge, training, and experience. Ralphie's "herd" is her care team of coaches and Handlers, who are with her daily, along with another buffalo, her companion.

Ralphie's Ranch
She lives on a ranch in an undisclosed location to protect and provide Ralphie with the best living environment. Only current members of the Ralphie Program (coaches, Handlers, and her veterinarians) are permitted to visit the ranch.

Ralphie, like all buffalo, adapts very well to the climate they live in. They have very efficient body mechanisms that allow them to cool themselves down during the hot and dry times of the year and keep themselves warm during the cold and wet winters. Buffalo thrive in all types of weather, from over 100-degree days with no clouds to well below zero with winter blizzards; they can handle all kinds of weather. Ralphie has large metal loafing sheds that allow her to get out of the weather; however, she prefers to be outside regardless of wind, rain, snow, ice, cold, or heat.

In addition to the splendor of her natural environment, Ralphie's pasture is dotted with large scratching posts made of old street sweeper brushes donated to the Ralphie Program by the City of Boulder. She uses these mainly in the spring to help shed her thick winter coat. Ralphie also has several large traffic cones, large rubber balls, and large tractor tires that she enjoys playing with.

Ralphie is fed premium grass hay daily to supplement the grass she grazes. Ralphie will eat about 25 - 30 pounds of grasses and hay daily. Daily, Ralphie's water tanks are cleaned of floating hay, and once a week, they are drained and scrubbed. Depending on the season, she drinks about 10 - 15 gallons of water a day. During the winter, Ralphie will eat snow as a source of water, but her water tanks are also heated, so she always has access to fresh water.

Ralphie's manure is gathered daily and put into a large compost pile. This serves multiple purposes, including decreasing the fly population, helping to keep her pastures fresh for her to graze, and speeding up the breakdown of the manure so it can be applied to the pastures as fertilizer.

During the summer months, flies are commonly associated with livestock. Various fly control methods are utilized to combat flies at Ralphie's ranch. Diatomaceous earth, essentially seashells that have been ground into a fine powder, is spread to dehydrate and reduce flies and make their breeding grounds less friendly. Another natural product used is Fly Predators, tiny files that will feed on the larva of the pest flies, thus preventing additional flies from hatching. Fly Predators do not bother Ralphie. If needed, adult flytraps are used to mitigate a substantial adult population, keeping them away Ralphie. Although many steps are taken to prevent and keep flies away from Ralphie, they are only a nuisance and do not harm Ralphie.

Veterinarian Care and Inspections
Ralphie has several advocates, besides her coaches and Handlers, that ensure her well-being. She has her veterinarian who provides annual wellness exams and vaccinations and is always available to come to check on her should the need arise. The University of Colorado's Institutional Animal Care and Use Committee (IACUC) also visit Ralphie for an annual inspection. The Ralphie Program has an exhibitor's license through the United States Department of Agriculture. With that, a USDA inspector conducts a surprise inspection every 8 - 12 months to ensure compliance with the Animal Welfare Act. The Ralphie Program strives to go further than the baseline requirements of all inspection standards.

Traveling with Ralphie
Ralphie always travels in a custom-made trailer designed just for her. The trailer is insulated on both the sides and the roof. It also has vents on the sides and roofs that can be opened and closed to adjust airflow and temperature inside the trailer. The inside walls and floor are lined with rubber mats for her comfort. The trailer is also long enough and wide enough for her to walk around turnaround and lie down if she wants. Special gates inside the trailer can be closed to allow the Handlers to easily and safely get her harness, headstall on her, and bring her in and out of the trailer. Whenever Ralphie travels, she always has fresh water and hay available if she wants it. Her trailer is cleaned every time she is moved, including in between halves at football games.

When Ralphie is meetings fans, she stays in her gold pen. The Handlers strategically stand around her pen to keep fans from getting too close or standing in a place or manner that would upset her. Handlers do not allow fans to pet or surround her, making sure she is comfortable. Still, they will help fans get a picture with her from a safe distance at "Ralphie's Corral" three hours before game time.

History
In 1934, a contest in the Silver & Gold newspaper determined the school mascot to be the buffaloes. For the final football game of the 1934 season, a group of students paid $25 to rent a buffalo calf to stand on the sidelines. Along with a real cowboy caretaker, it took four students to keep the calf, the son of "Killer", a famed bison at Trails End Ranch in Fort Collins, calm on the sidelines. As far as luck though, Colorado won 7–0 against the University of Denver on Thanksgiving Day.

Prior to 1934, CU athletic teams were referred to as Arapahoes, Big Horns, Frontiersmen, Grizzlies, Hornets, Silver and Gold, Silver Helmets, and Yellow Jackets. The student newspaper decided to sponsor a national contest in the summer of 1934, with a $5 prize to go to the author of the winning selection. Over 1,000 entries arrived from almost every state. Athletic Director Harry Carlson, Graduate Manager Walter Franklin, and Kenneth Bundy of the Silver and Gold were the judges.

Local articles first reported that Claude Bates of New Madrid, Missouri, and James Proffitt of Cincinnati, Ohio, were co-winners for the prize as both submitted "Buffaloes" as their entry. However, a few days later, the newspaper declared Boulder resident A. J. "Andy" Dickson the winner, after a follow-up investigation revealed his submission of "Buffaloes" had actually arrived several days before those of the original winners. Through the years, synonyms which quickly came into use included Bisons, Buffs, Golden Avalanche, Golden Buffaloes, Stampeding Herd, and Thundering Herd.

Live buffaloes made appearances at Colorado games on and off throughout the early years, usually in a pen on the field or sometimes driven around in a trailer. In the 1940s, the school kept a baby buffalo in a special pen at the University Riding Academy. The first named buffalo was "Mr. Chips", who appeared for the first time at the 1957 CU Days Kickoff Rally and was cared for by a men's honorary society.

In 1966 the Student Body Government decided that the University of Colorado Boulder needed a full-time live buffalo mascot. Freshman Class Officer Bill Lowery talked to his father who purchased and donated the original "Ralphie" to Colorado in March 1966. The Student Body Government planned for it to be the job of the Sophomore Class Officer's to take Ralphie to all home football games."

There are a couple versions of the story on how Ralphie became the name of the beloved mascot. One story says the Student Body Government held a "Name the Buffalo" contest and received many entries. One entry was for "Ralph", in honor of the Junior Class president at the time, Ralph Jay Wallace. Another story says that "Ralph" was chosen as her name by the Student Body Government in reference to the noise made when throwing up. What is known for sure is that the original spelling of her name was "Rraalph" but was changed to "Ralphie" at the end of the 1967 football season.

Ralphie first appeared on the sidelines of a football game on October 1, 1966. Colorado beat Kansas State 10–0. Around that same time, head football coach Eddie Crowder was approached with the idea of the buffalo charging out on the field before the game, the team closely following. After much discussion, the debut of this great tradition took place on September 16, 1967. Colorado beat Baylor 27–7. Ever since then Ralphie has been leading the way as the football team takes the field.

After the 1967 football season, the Student Body Government realized it was not smart to have it be the tradition for the Sophomore Class Officers to run with Ralphie, and instead it would be better to have trained individuals with large animal experience take the tradition over.

The Ralphie Live Mascot Program has since evolved, becoming a prestigious athletic endeavor for 15 student athletes and buffalo enthusiasts. It is currently under the direction of Program Manager and Coach Taylor Stratton and Assistant Program Manager and Coach Colton Behr, both were Handlers when they were students at Colorado.

Ralphie I

Born: November 1965, Sedgewick, Colorado

Died: May 13, 1982

Served: October 1, 1966 - November 18, 1978

Folsom Field Games: 65

Mile High Stadium Games: 0

Away Stadium Games: 6

Conference Championship Games: 0

Bowl Games: 7

Football Team Record When Ralphie Ran at Folsom Field: 51-14

Football Team Record When Ralphie Ran at Any Game: 57-21 

Total Games: 78

In March 1966, John Lowery, the father of a Colorado freshman from Lubbock, Texas, purchased a six- month old buffalo calf from Sedgewick, Colorado for $150 and donated her to the University. Lowery bought the calf from rancher Art Kashcke. Bill Lowery (John's son), John McGill, Don Marturano, and Vic Reinking were the original Ralphie Handlers who trained Ralphie I.

Ralphie first attended a game on October 1, 1966 when Colorado played Kansas State. Ralphie did not run onto the field during the game, but stood on the sideline and slept in her trailer. Colorado won the game 10–0. She attended the remaining three home football games that year, standing on the sidelines.

Around that same time, head football coach Eddie Crowder was approached with the idea of the buffalo charging out onto the field before the game, the team closely following. After much discussion, the debut of this great tradition took place on September 16, 1967, when Colorado played Baylor. Colorado beat Baylor 27–7. Ever since then Ralphie has been leading the way as the football team takes the field. Ralphie's first bowl game was the Bluebonnet Bowl on December 23, 1967, where Colorado beat Miami (FL) 31–21. The five sophomores that ‘handled’ her appointed themselves as the board of directors of a fundraising effort to bring Ralphie to Houston. By selling "Buffalo Stock", they raised the necessary funds to send Ralphie to Houston, and help cover other costs associated with the program.

In 1976, the President of The Bank of Boulder, Steve Bosley, proposed to Crowder they would do a fundraiser to send Ralphie to the Orange Bowl game against Ohio State. When a reporter asked Bosley how Ralphie would travel to Miami, he explained that the information was top secret since Colorado was concerned that Ohio State students would try to kidnap, or "buffalo-nap" Ralphie. The story of the potential "buffalo-napping" made newspapers nationwide, featuring a picture of Ralphie in full charge with her Handlers. The story stimulated over $25,000 in donations. Ralphie's trip to the Orange Bowl cost $2,500, and the balance was put into a fund for Ralphie's future care.

Ralphie I attended every Colorado home football game for 13 years, including all bowl games, and retired at the end of the 1978 season. The team matured too, selecting and training knowledgeable Handlers. The Handlers wore classic western attire while working with Ralphie, and initially would wear their cowboy boots when running with Ralphie. In 1978 the Handlers began to wear athletic shoes when running with Ralphie instead of cowboy boots, finding that it was easier to run faster and guide Ralphie while in athletic shoes.

Colorado's first Ralphie achieved national celebrity status, and was even kidnapped in 1970 by some Air Force Academy cadets, as well as being named Colorado's 1971 Homecoming Queen at the height of the anti-establishment era. In 1968, Ralphie was promoted as a candidate for Student Body President with the slogan of "What's It To You?" She did not win the election.

During the football season Ralphie lived at the Green Meadows Riding Stable, located near present-day East Campus of the University, owned by C.D. "Buddy" Hays. Hays not only cared for and trained Ralphie, he was also the coach of the Colorado Rodeo Club. The Ralphie Handlers would also practice and work with Ralphie in the arena of Green Meadows Riding Stable. In the off-season Ralphie lived on the pastures at Hidden Valley Ranch, where Hays also kept his herd of buffalo, located north of Boulder. Ralphie I lived at Hidden Valley Ranch until 1981 when she moved to the McKenzie Ranch located in North Boulder. Ralphie traveled in a modified steel, brown, 4-horse trailer, donated by Hays. She used a custom harness and headstall made by Ray Cornell out of Boulder, Colorado that lead ropes were attached to allow the Handlers to run with her and help guide her around the field.

Ralphie I also had four calves, the sire of the calves was a large bull at Hidden Valley Ranch named Barney. In May 1971, Ralphie's first calf unfortunately died during a strong snowstorm. On April 27, 1972, Buffie, named by Colorado students, was born, but died from pneumonia on October 18, 1972. She made one public appearance on October 14, 1972 at the Colorado Homecoming game against Iowa State, standing on the sidelines. On April 16, 1974, her third calf, Streaker, was born, but died from an accident on the ranch in October 1974. Her fourth and final calf was Spirit who was born in August 1975. Ralphie I's fourth calf, Spirit made her public debut at the 1975 homecoming parade. She ran during the second half run of the CU vs. Missouri game behind Ralphie I. CU beat Missouri 31–20. She was sold to a local rancher shortly after, not having the correct disposition to become the next Ralphie. Ralphie I's final game was the first half run on November 18, 1978 against Iowa State. Colorado lost 16–20 to Iowa State. Ralphie I died on May 13, 1982, she was 16 years old.

Ralphie II

Born: May 25, 1975, Longmont, Colorado

Died: September 19, 1987

Served: November 18, 1978 – September 19, 1987

Folsom Field Games: 49

Mile High Stadium Games: 0

Away Stadium Games: 2

Conference Championship Games: 0

Bowl Games: 2

Football Team Record When Ralphie Ran at Folsom Field: 17-32

Football Team Record When Ralphie Ran at Any Game: 19-34

Total Games: 53

In 1978, when Ralphie I became ill, Steve Bosley organized a search for a new buffalo headed by Buddy Hays. Hays discovered a yearling buffalo named Moonshine, owned by Gregg C. Mackenzie. Bosley, The Bank of Boulder, and Bank Director Robert Confer bought Moonshine from Mackenzie for $1,000 and donated her to Colorado. Since "Ralphie" had become the well-known name of the buffalo, Athletic Director Eddie Crowder made it permanent.

Ralphie II was originally named Moon as she was born during a lunar eclipse. Her mother unfortunately died during labor, and she was raised by ranch hands on the Broken Spear Ranch. In 1976, Mackenzie purchased Moon from Ron Gregory, owner of Broken Spear Ranch, and raised her for his FFA project at Smoky Hill High School in Aurora, Colorado. Her name changed to Moonshine as a more fitting name for a female buffalo.

Mackenzie continued to train Ralphie II and was an assistant coach when Buddy Hays left in 1979, until 1983. Jim Wright, who was a former Handler, took charge over coaching duties from 1979 – 1987. In 1985, Ken Kramer, a Handler from 1980 – 1983, took over the leadership of the program until 1988 after serving as an assistant coach in 1984. Ralphie II lived at Hidden Valley Ranch until 1981, when she moved to the McKenzie Ranch located in North Boulder. Ralphie II moved to several different ranches after living a few years at the McKenzie ranch, ending up at B-J Acres, north of Erie, Colorado in 1985. In 1985 Johnnie Parker took over the program and the training of Ralphie II as well as housed her at the Parker Ranch in Hudson, Colorado.

Ralphie II made her debut on November 18, 1978, the final home game of the season. Standing on the sideline as Ralphie I made her final run around the field for the first half run, Ralphie II took over for the second half run. Colorado lost 16–20 to Iowa State, but the Ralphie Program and name became a tradition. In 1979, Ralphie took a trip to Steamboat Springs, Colorado for the NCAA Skiing Championships to support the school's ski team, which Colorado won. In 1985, Colorado selected the homecoming theme of "Ralphie goes to Hollywood". In 1986, Ralphie made the trip to Oklahoma State University (OSU) and ran at the Colorado vs. Oklahoma State game and stayed at OSU's veterinary clinic. Students from OSU broke into the clinic that night and spray painted "OSU" in orange letters on her side.

Ralphie II was transported around in the same modified steel, brown, 4-horse trailer that Ralphie I used. Initially Ralphie II used the same custom leather harness that Ralphie I used, but used a different headstall. The harness was modified to fit Ralphie II's bigger size than Ralphie I's. In 1986 a new harness and headstall was used by Ralphie, this one was built by Carl W. Pike Saddlery out of Boulder, Colorado, the same company who modified the original harness to fit Ralphie II. The new headstall featured the iconic brass "CU" emblem on the front. While always a part of the Athletic Department, it was not until 1987 when Ralphie Handlers first earned a Varsity Letter for their participation.

Ralphie II was also named an honorary member of the Colorado Wildlife Foundation in 1979. In the fall of 1986 Ralphie II was confirmed to be pregnant, but the calf died during the pregnancy. She was expected to retire at the end of the 1987 season. However, at the age of 12, and after serving the Buffs for 10 years, Ralphie II died on September 19, 1987, following a 31-17 Colorado win over Stanford. Ralphie II was buried in Hudson, Colorado.

Ralphie III

Born: June 3, 1985, Laramie, Wyoming

Died: January 20, 1998

Served: September 26, 1987 – November 28, 1997

Folsom Field Games: 62

Mile High Stadium Games: 0

Away Stadium Games: 3

Conference Championship Games: 0

Bowl Games: 8

Football Team Record When Ralphie Ran at Folsom Field: 48-12-2

Football Team Record When Ralphie Ran at Any Game: 55-16-2

Total Games: 73

On June 3, 1985, Chuck Brackenbury was out mending fences on the Joe Miller Ranch outside of Laramie, Wyoming, when he noticed a buffalo giving birth early in the morning. He checked back later that night and discovered the mom had died during labor, but the calf was still alive just standing there all alone. He brought the calf back to his ranch where she was bottle-fed and raised with horses and a goat. She was originally given the name of Buffy. Brackenbury eventually sold her to Bob Renaud, a buffalo rancher in Hudson, Colorado. In September 1987, Johnnie and Shaaron Parker bought the 2-year old buffalo from Renaud and donated her to the University. Parker also trained and housed her. Ralphie III was a lot bigger and faster than her two predecessors, and was given the name Tequila because of her fiery personality.

Ralphie III was brought into action earlier than anticipated, making her debut run on November 7, 1987 at a home game against Missouri. She did attend the two home games after Ralphie II died, but did not run, instead standing on the sidelines. Ralphie III was being trained for the 1988 season, as Ralphie II was to retire following the 1987 season. When Ralphie II died earlier than anticipated, and after only five weeks of training, Ralphie III finished the 1987 season. The Buffs welcomed her with a 27–10 victory over Missouri. On August 26, 1990, Ralphie III traveled to Anaheim, California when Colorado took on Tennessee in the Pigskin Classic. Though she was in attendance, she did not run onto the field since stadium officials did not allow it. The game ended in a tie, 31-31.

On October 22, 1988 when Colorado played Oklahoma, Ralphie III and a second buffalo named Vicky, led the football team onto the field to start the game. Vicky used Ralphie II's old harness for the run, but did not run at the start of the second half. Vicky was born in May 1988 in Wyoming. Though she was originally dubbed Ralphie IV, Vicky did not have the temperament to be the next Ralphie and was subsequently sold to buffalo rancher a short time later. CU lost to Oklahoma 14–17.

In 1991, Ted Davis joined the program as a coach. In 1994, Gail Pederson began helping with the Ralphie Program behind the scenes, overseeing all the logistics, scheduling, and planning for the program. Ralphie III was initially transported in the same modified steel, brown, 4-horse trailer that carried Ralphie I and II, but in 1992, a new custom steel, black stock trailer was purchased for Ralphie through a donation from Coors Brewing Company. Initially she used the same harness and headstall that was used by Ralphie II. In 1989 a new harness and headstall was used, again with a large brass "CU" on the front. The new harness and headstall was built by M. King Saddlery out of Boulder, Colorado.

Ralphie III was the first Ralphie to wear the "Ralphie Blanket". The blanket is a custom-made banner blanket that reads "Go Buffaloes" on one side, and "Beat [the opposing team]" on the other side, such as "Beat CSU." Shaaron Parker maintained the blanket and updated the opposing team's name each week.

Ralphie III led the Buffaloes on the field in 73 games, including 62 times in Boulder, eight bowl games, two times in Fort Collins, Colorado, and once in Stillwater, Oklahoma. After 11 years of service, she died on January 20, 1998, at the age of 12. Her final game was against Nebraska on November 28, 1997. Colorado lost 24–27.

After Ralphie's death, the Colorado State Senate passed State Resolution 98–10 by Senator Elsie Lacy, a tribute to Ralphie III, the University of Colorado buffalo mascot, stating: "That the University of Colorado and fans alike have lost a most beloved mascot and are saddened by the occasion of Ralphie III's death." Ralphie III was buried in Hudson, Colorado.

Ralphie IV

Born: April 1997, Gallatin Gateway, Montana

Died: March 19, 2017

Served: September 5, 1998 – August 31, 2008

Folsom Field Games: 55

Mile High Stadium Games: 9

Away Stadium Games: 1

Conference Championship Games: 4

Bowl Games: 6

Football Team Record When Ralphie Ran at Folsom Field: 36-19

Football Team Record When Ralphie Ran at Any Game: 44-31

Total Games: 75

Ralphie IV was born in April 1997 on the Flying D Ranch in Gallatin Gateway, Montana, owned by Ted Turner, who donated her to the University of Colorado. While out checking the herd, Todd Traucht the buffalo manager at Flying D, found a newborn abandoned buffalo with her mother nowhere to be found. After checking out the baby buffalo, he found bite marks around her neck from a coyote attack. Being an abandoned buffalo and just surviving a coyote attack, Traucht took her home to be bottle fed and raised by him and his wife Susie. Traucht named her Rowdy due to her excitable nature. She was released back to the herd, but would not bond with them. She was then donated to Colorado as a yearling in April 1998. Johnnie Parker, who trained and housed both Ralphie II and III, brought her back to Colorado from Montana and supervised her early training.

Parker retired from the program in May 1999, after 13 years of working with the program, and housing and training Ralphie II, III, and IV. Longtime Colorado supporters Dale and Lynn Johnson housed Ralphie for the following year and coach Ted Davis assumed the program duties for the 2000 season. In the summer of 2001, two former Ralphie Handlers and Colorado graduates, Benny Frei and Kevin Priola, took over the program including the housing of Ralphie IV. Ralphie IV was transported in the same custom steel, black stock trailer that carried Ralphie III. She also used the same harness and headstall that was used by Ralphie III. Ralphie IV also continued to wear the "Ralphie Blanket", being maintained by Priola's wife, Michelle, who also updated the opposing team's name each week.

Ralphie IV weighed about 1,100 pounds, over three times her weight when she made her debut against Colorado State University at Mile High Stadium in Denver on September 5, 1998. Colorado won 42–14. Her final game was also against Colorado State University on August 31, 2008. Colorado won that game 38–17. Ralphie IV retired after 10 years of service and lived out her retirement in Henderson, Colorado. She ran at all four Big-12 Conference Championship games that Colorado played in, and traveled to six bowl games. She also made a historic trip to Athens, Georgia in 2006 when Colorado played the University of Georgia. In total, she ran at 75 football games during her career. She died on March 19, 2017, due to liver failure. She would have turned 20 years old the next month, a long life for a buffalo. Ralphie IV was buried in Henderson, Colorado.

Ralphie V

Born: October 2006, Cimarron, New Mexico

Served: September 6, 2008 – November 23, 2019

Folsom Field Games: 65

Mile High Stadium Games: 10

Away Stadium Games: 0

Conference Championship Games: 0

Bowl Games: 1

Football Team Record When Ralphie Ran at Folsom Field: 31-34

Football Team Record When Ralphie Ran at Any Game: 39-37

Total Games: 76

Ralphie V was born in October 2006 on the Vermejo Park Ranch located in Cimarron, New Mexico, owned by Ted Turner. Like Ralphie IV, Ted Turner donated Ralphie V to the University. As the darkest calf in the herd, she was named "Blackout" by ranch hands. Ralphie Program Directors Benny Frei and Kevin Priola worked with Barney Coppedge, the Bison Manager at Vermejo Park Ranch, to bring Ralphie V to Colorado. Frei continues to house Ralphie V.

Ralphie V came to Colorado in January 2007, and was introduced at "Ralphie’s Salute to a New Era" on November 17, 2007. A little over one-year-old, she weighed in at 450 pounds. Her debut game run came against Eastern Washington on September 6, 2008. Colorado won that game 31–24. Ralphie V is by far the fastest and largest of all the previous Ralphies.

Ralphie V has now reached maturity, weighing approximately 1,200 pounds and standing about 5 feet tall at her hump. Her growing has stopped, but not her speed or strength. She currently completes her run around Folsom Field, nearly two football fields in length, in less than 25 seconds.

At the end of the 2008 season, Priola retired from the program, and John Graves, a former Ralphie Handler, was brought on as the Assistant Director. In the summer of 2015 Graves was promoted to Program Manager, replacing Gail Pederson who retired after 20 years of helping the program. Graves now oversees the day-to-day activities of the program and the training of the Handlers and Ralphie. In the spring of 2016 Taylor Stratton, also a former Ralphie Handler, was brought on as the new Assistant Coach.

Ralphie V was initially transported in the same custom steel, black stock trailer that carried Ralphie III and IV. In 2012 a new, highly customized aluminum stock trailer was purchased through donations made to the program, which is now used to transport Ralphie V. In 2016, a new black leather harness and headstall was used for Ralphie, built by Bill Jesser Saddlery out of Longmont, Colorado. The new harness kept the iconic brass "CU" located on the front of her headstall, and the leather color was switched from brown to black. The brass CU logo was made by Ray "Butch" Cornell, the son of Ray Cornell who built the first Ralphie harness. The previous harness that she wore was also worn by Ralphie III and IV. Ralphie V wore the "Ralphie Blanket" for her first two-season, but never liked to wear it and has not worn it since.

Ralphie V makes many appearances throughout the school year to support Colorado and the University. During football seasons, she attends the Ralphie's Corral pre-game party on campus. One hour before kickoff, Ralphie stands on the northeast sideline, ready to welcome the Buffs onto the field.

Ralphie V officially retired on November 12, 2019 after almost 12 seasons. Due to temperament issues, she did not run the previous 2 home football games prior to her retirement. The search for the next mascot, to be named Ralphie VI, was said to be "ongoing" as of November 2019.

Ralphie VI 

Born: May 27 2020, Chadron, Nebraska

Served: September 1, 2021 – Present

Folsom Field Games: 6

Mile High Stadium Games: 0

Away Stadium Games: 0

Conference Championship Games: 0

Bowl Games: 0

Football Team Record When Ralphie Ran at Folsom Field: 4-2

Football Team Record When Ralphie Ran at Any Game: 4-2

Total Games: 6

On September 1, 2021, Ralphie VI was formally announced as the successor to Ralphie V.  Ralphie VI was born on May 27, 2020 on a ranch belonging to Colorado alumnus Will Isham just north of Chadron, Nebraska.  Orphaned at birth after being rejected by her mother, Ralphie VI was adopted and raised in part by a beef cow.  After it was decided that Ralphie V would retire, Taylor Stratton, manager of the Ralphie Live Mascot Program, reached out to her friend Drew, the daughter of Will Isham, in an effort to identify a possible candidate to succeed Ralphie V.  Ralphie VI was donated to the University in November 2020.  As of her introduction, she currently weighs just under 500 pounds.  Ralphie VI made her debut on September 3, 2021 at the televised game between CU and Northern Colorado.

Traditions

She rarely travels to away games—bowl games excluded—and only when permitted by the rules of the host stadium. Ralphie IV traveled to the September 23, 2006 game against the Georgia Bulldogs along with an ESPN producer and cameraman who documented the trip and aired a special on that weekend's College Gameday. She also traveled to the 2005 Champs Sports Bowl.

She used to wear a custom-made banner that read "GO CU" on one side, and "Beat [the opposing team]" on the other side with the CU Logo, such as "Beat CSU". Ralphie travels to games and appearances in a black custom stock trailer emblazoned with her name in gold. Ralphie and her trailer are pulled through the University Hill neighborhood before games on her way to the stadium.

Ralphie is held in a secret location so that she will not be harassed or harmed by the public, keeping her and the public safe from harm.

A tradition of the Ralphie Handler Team is to eat a large team breakfast or lunch at a local diner prior to game-day events.

Gallery

See also
Colorado Buffaloes football
University of Colorado Boulder#Mascot; spirit program
Colorado Buffaloes#Mascots

References

External links

University of Colorado Ralphie official site
ESPN Page 2 - article about Ralphie and her handlers
Colorado Traditions
College football's 12 coolest mascots: 1. Ralphie the Buffalo, Colorado. FoxSports.com. Retrieved 2010-09-01.

Colorado Buffaloes football
Individual bovines
Pac-12 Conference mascots
Individual animals in the United States